Peyton List may refer to:

 Peyton List (actress, born 1986), American actress from Massachusetts; starred in Mad Men, FlashForward, and Frequency
 Peyton List (actress, born 1998), American actress from Florida; starred in Jessie, Bunk'd,  Diary of a Wimpy Kid, and Cobra Kai

See also
 Peyton (disambiguation)